Hank Hazard is an iOS game developed by British studio Chillingo Ltd., and released on December 22, 2011.

Critical reception
The game has a Metacritic score of 86% based on 8 critic reviews.

References

2011 video games
Android (operating system) games
Fictional hamsters
IOS games
Puzzle video games
Video games developed in the United Kingdom
Chillingo games